Jeffrey Marshall Foxworthy (born September 6, 1958) is an American actor, author, comedian, producer and writer. He is a member of the Blue Collar Comedy Tour, with Larry the Cable Guy, Bill Engvall, and Ron White. Known for his "You might be a redneck" one-liners, Foxworthy has released six major-label comedy albums. His first two albums were each certified triple Platinum by the Recording Industry Association of America. He has written several books based on his redneck jokes, as well as an autobiography entitled No Shirt, No Shoes... No Problem!

Foxworthy has also made several ventures into television, starting in the mid-1990s with his own sitcom called The Jeff Foxworthy Show. He has also appeared alongside Engvall and Larry the Cable Guy in several Blue Collar television specials, including Blue Collar TV for The WB. Since 2007, he has been the host of the quiz show Are You Smarter than a 5th Grader? on Fox (2007–2009 and 2015) and in syndication (2009–11). Foxworthy hosted a nationally syndicated radio show called The Foxworthy Countdown from April 1999 to December 2009. For three seasons, he hosted GSN's The American Bible Challenge.

Early life
Foxworthy was born in Atlanta, Georgia, on September 6, 1958, the first of three children of Carole Linda (née Camp) and IBM executive Jimmy Abstance Foxworthy. His parents were both of English descent, with his roots lying in the county of Essex. His grandfather, James Marvin Camp, was a Hapeville firefighter for over three decades. He has two younger siblings, Jay Foxworthy and Jennifer Foxworthy.

According to Foxworthy, who grew up in the Southern Baptist tradition, he remembers accepting Jesus Christ when he was seven years old. When he told his mother that he wanted to go down to the local sanctuary to accept Christ as his Lord and Savior, his mother, who felt he was too young, told him to wait until he had a firmer understanding of the undertaking. Foxworthy argued with her until a preacher came to their home and vouched for Foxworthy, who went back to the church that night with his mother. Despite this, Foxworthy says that complying with the often-strict rules of the church were difficult for him, saying, "I love God, but I can't act and dress like that.”

Foxworthy graduated from Hapeville High School. He attended Georgia Institute of Technology in Atlanta, but left just before graduating. He worked for five years in mainframe computer maintenance at IBM, where his father also worked. At the urging of IBM co-workers, Foxworthy entered and won the Great Southeastern Laugh-off at Atlanta's Punchline comedy club in 1984.

Career

Comedy albums
In 1993, he released You Might Be a Redneck If…, which topped the comedy albums chart and started the "You Might Be a Redneck" fad. The album went gold in 1994, platinum by 1995, and 3× platinum by 1996, which is more than three million copies.

Foxworthy's July 1995 release Games Rednecks Play received a 1996 Grammy nomination for Best Spoken Comedy Album.

Totally Committed was released in May 1998. In conjunction with the album was a one-hour HBO stand-up special by the same name. The album reached "gold" status and received a 1999 Grammy Award nomination. The video for the Totally Committed song featured frequent references to then-Atlanta Braves pitcher, Greg Maddux as well as an appearance at the very end by Maddux himself (along with teammate John Smoltz).

In 2001, Foxworthy received a nomination for Best Spoken Comedy Album for the 43rd Annual Grammys.

Television
In 1995, Foxworthy starred in The Jeff Foxworthy Show, a sitcom created out of his stand-up comedy persona. It aired on ABC, but was canceled after one season. NBC subsequently picked up the show, but it was again canceled after one season. Later, he remarked that the network did not understand how to properly market his humor; thinking his routine was "too Southern" for a national network ("Has anyone heard me talk?", he commented in one of his stand-up routines), they based the first season of his sitcom in Bloomington, Indiana. Later, the series aired on Nick at Nite and CMT in 2005 and 2006. He also appeared in Alan Jackson's video for "I Don't Even Know Your Name" in 1995.

Foxworthy hosted Country Weekly's ""TNN Music City News Country Awards" show for 1998, 1999, and 2000.

In 1998, Foxworthy appeared on the mock talk show Space Ghost Coast to Coast, where he attempts to explain his famous “You might be a Redneck” joke to Space Ghost, yet fails entirely. Throughout the episode, Space Ghost, Zorak, and Moltar are taking the Ghost Planet to the US, with plans to make it the 51st state. By the end of the episode Foxworthy is sent to “The Box”.

He hosted Are You Smarter than A 5th Grader? on Fox in prime time. He hosted the syndicated version of the series from September 21, 2009, until its cancellation on March 24, 2011. It was announced that Foxworthy would return as host of Are You Smarter than a 5th Grader? In addition, he is a host on The Bucks of Tecomate which airs on the NBC Sports Network with Alabama native David Morris.

He was the subject of a Comedy Central Roast in 2005.

In 2011, Foxworthy appeared as a guest “Shark” for two episodes of ABC’s second season of Shark Tank.

Since August 2012, Foxworthy has been the host and a producer of the GSN biblical-themed game show The American Bible Challenge, which has aired two seasons. He is also the host of the food reality competition series The American Baking Competition, which aired its first season in summer 2013.

Foxworthy has appeared as host and featured guest on several programs on the Outdoor Channel and Versus.

In February 2019, Foxworthy was announced as a judge for NBC's comedy competition series Bring the Funny.

In 2020, a new episode of Ellen's Game of Games featured Jeff Foxworthy on a game of Stink Tank.

Blue Collar Comedy

In the early 2000s, Foxworthy had a career resurgence as a result of the Blue Collar Comedy Tour, in which he and three other comedians          (Larry the Cable Guy, Ron White, and Bill Engvall), specializing in common-man comedy, toured the country and performed for record crowds. The tour lasted three full years, constantly being extended after an initial run of 20 shows.

In 2004, he launched a new television series called Blue Collar TV on The WB Television Network, Comedy Central, and Comedy Network (2007). He served as executive producer and starred alongside Blue Collar Comedy Tour-mates Larry the Cable Guy and Bill Engvall. (Ron White made occasional guest appearances.) On Larry the Cable Guy's website, he posted that the show was canceled on October 17, 2005, by WB. Reruns of Blue Collar TV continued until the network merged with UPN to form The CW. In 2006, Foxworthy resurrected the Blue Collar TV format on Country Music Television (CMT) with Foxworthy's Big Night Out. The show began airing in the fall and was canceled after one season of 12 episodes.

Books
Foxworthy has authored several books, including You Might Be a Redneck If... (1989), as well as his autobiography, No Shirt, No Shoes, No Problem! (1996). Artist Layron DeJarnette provided illustrations for the Redneck Dictionary books. R. David Boyd has been the exclusive illustrator for most of Foxworthy's books and album covers.

He also has released a cookbook entitled The Redneck Grill, co-authored with Newnan, Georgia, artist R. David Boyd, and "Redneck Extreme Mobile Home Makeover" (2005), a book with some of his redneck jokes.

Written works
 Jeff Foxworthy's Redneck Dictionary: Words You Thought You Knew the Meaning Of (2005)
 Jeff Foxworthy's Redneck Dictionary II: More Words You Thought You Knew the Meaning Of (2006)
 Jeff Foxworthy's Redneck Dictionary III: Learning to Talk More Gooder Fastly (2007)
 Rednecks in College

In February 2008, Foxworthy released his first children's book Dirt On My Shirt. This was followed by Silly Street in 2009 and Hide!!! in 2010, both of which were illustrated by Steve Bjorkman.

In May 2008, Foxworthy released How to Really Stink at Golf, with co-author Brian Hartt and illustrations by Layron DeJarnette. In May 2009, he released How to Really Stink at Work, A Guide to Making Yourself Fire-Proof While Having the Most Fun Possible. This book was also co-authored with Hartt and illustrations by DeJarnette.

Radio work
In April 1999, Foxworthy began The Foxworthy Countdown, a nationally syndicated, weekly radio show, which featured the top 30 country hits of the week, as reported by Mediabase. In 2001, he received a Country Music Association nomination for "Broadcast Personality of the Year". The program's last broadcast, the 2009 year-end countdown, aired the weekend of December 27, 2009. In 2006, Sirius Satellite Radio launched the Blue Collar Comedy channel, which featured stand-up comedy centered around the Blue Collar group. In 2015, now under the SiriusXM banner, the station rebranded as Jeff & Larry's Comedy Roundup, which featured similar programming to the previous channel with an enhanced focus on Foxworthy and Larry the Cable Guy.

Foxworthy Outdoors
In August 2011, Foxworthy launched Foxworthy Outdoors, a website carrying an assortment of Foxworthy-brand hunting and outdoors products. On the site, he also hosts a web series called Jeff Foxworthy: Inside & Out, featuring some of his friends as they document hunting trips, fishing outings, and land conservation on his Georgia farm.

Other 
In 2017 Foxworthy created the card game Relative Insanity, a game similar to Cards Against Humanity with a family theme. Family Game Shelf praised the game, saying "it will have you laughing until your sides hurt".

Personal life
Foxworthy met his wife Pamela Gregg at the Punchline in Atlanta, Georgia, and they married on September 18, 1985. They have two daughters, Jordan and Julianne. He is a noted hunting enthusiast, beginning when he was a teen hunting on his father's farm property in Central Georgia.

Political positions
In 2012, Foxworthy endorsed Republican presidential candidate Mitt Romney, and had donated in the 2000s to the presidential campaign of George W. Bush, as well as the Republican National Committee. Despite this, he doesn't include politics in his comedy. In 2015 he stated that Donald Trump is "tapping into the American spirit".

Discography

Foxworthy has released five comedy albums for Warner Bros. Records, as well as one for DreamWorks Records. One of his albums included the novelty Christmas song "Redneck 12 Days of Christmas", which reached No. 18 on the Hot Country Songs charts in late 1995 to early 1996.

Filmography

Film

Television

Writing Credits

Producing Credits

Accolades

See also
 List of stand-up comedians
 List of game show hosts

Notes

References

 Gilbert, Calvin (1998). "Jeff Foxworthy". In The Encyclopedia of Country Music. Paul Kingsbury, Editor. New York: Oxford University Press. pp. 180–1.

External links

 
 
 Jeff Foxworthy Interview on The Big Idea w/Donny Deutsch
 The Jeff Foxworthy Show on The WB Television Network

1958 births
Living people
20th-century American comedians
20th-century American male actors
21st-century American comedians
21st-century American male actors
American children's writers
American country singer-songwriters
American game show hosts
American investors
American male comedians
American male voice actors
American people of English descent
American stand-up comedians
Audiobook narrators
Comedians from Georgia (U.S. state)
Culture of Atlanta
Country musicians from Georgia (U.S. state)
Georgia Tech alumni
Georgia (U.S. state) Republicans
Male actors from Atlanta
Participants in American reality television series
People from Hapeville, Georgia
Radio personalities from Atlanta
Singer-songwriters from Georgia (U.S. state)
Southern Baptists
Warner Records artists
Writers from Atlanta